Kington is a surname. Notable people with the surname include:

 L. Brent Kington, American artist and metalsmith
 Miles Kington, British journalist and musician
 Philip Kington (1832–1892), English businessman, landowner and cricketer
 Raynard S. Kington, deputy director of the U.S. National Institutes of Health, and will become the president of Grinnell College
 Thomas Kington (1794–1874), English clergyman
 William Kington (1838–1898), British soldier and cricketer

In fiction
 Jonathan Kington, CIA codemaster in the TV series Decker

English-language surnames